Osijek–Rijeka derby  is the name given to matches between NK Osijek and HNK Rijeka. On Croatian First Football League all time table Rijeka and Osijek are on the third and fourth place. Rijeka is the third-most successful Croatian football club, having won one Croatian First Football League title, six Croatian Football Cups, two Yugoslav Cups, one Croatian Football Super Cup and the 1977–78 Balkans Cup. Osijek won one Croatian Football Cup. 

Rijeka and Osijek are with Dinamo Zagreb and Hajduk Split the only four clubs that have never been relegated from the Croatian First League.

Osijek and Rijeka are third and fourth best supported football clubs in Croatia. Osijek is supported by 5% and Rijeka by 4% of population. 

The teams are supported by their ultras groups called Armada Rijeka and Kohorta Osijek.

Supporters

Armada is football ultras group that support HNK Rijeka. They also support Rijeka's other sports clubs, such as RK Zamet (handball), Primorje EB (waterpolo) and KK Kvarner 2010 (basketball).

The name Armada was given in 1987 at a bar in the "Ri" shopping mall in Rijeka, and the first game attended by the Armada was the Final of the Yugoslav football cup against Hajduk Split in Belgrade on 9 May 1987. The newly formed supporters group named themselves after the Spanish Armada because of the strength they showed in their support. Their fiercest rivals are BBB (Bad Blue Boys), Torcida and Kohorta.

At home games, Armada members gather in the west stand at Stadion Kantrida and in the last few years in the north stand of Stadion Rujevica, from where they fiercely support their club. They also regularly support Rijeka in the club's away games. They regularly display choreographies and light up flares.

Their mottos are: Sami protiv svih - Alone against everybody, and Krepat, ma ne molat - Die but not give up. Armada's mascot is a shark.

Kohorta Osijek is a group of supporters of Croatian soccer club NK Osijek. During the soccer match it is located on the southeast and east stands of the Gradski vrt stadium in Osijek.

Results

By competition

By ground

Last updated: 7 March 2021.

List of matches

Key

1992–present

Yugoslav First League results (1946–1991)

The tables list the place each team took in each of the seasons.

Prva HNL results

The tables list the place each team took in each of the seasons.

See also
Eternal derby
Adriatic derby 
Dinamo–Rijeka derby

References

External links
List of matches at 1. HNL site at   

Football derbies in Croatia
derby
NK Osijek